Mura-Drava-Danube (UNESCO designation: Bačko Podunavlje) is a transboundary biosphere reserve along the Drava, Mura and Danube rivers.

Flood prevention dams on the rivers separate the reserve into a flooded area and a flood-controlled side.

It is one of the best preserved wetlands in the Danube River Basin area. In 2009, the preliminary bilateral agreement between Croatia and Hungary was reached on creating a joint natural reserve in the Drava-Danube region. It should include the already protected areas: Kopački rit, Veliki Pažut, Mura-Drava (in Croatia), Danube-Drava National Park (in Hungary), Gornje Podunavlje, Karađorđevo, Tikvara (in Serbia) and several Natura 2000 protected areas in Austria, Slovenia and Hungary. With  in total, it would be among the largest protected terrestrial areas in Europe, hence it was named the "Amazon of Europe - Mura-Drava-Danube". In June 2016 UNESCO officially designated the reserve and in September 2016 five ministers opened the reserve and agreed on future cooperation and joint management. That management will include the administration of the river ecosystems in sustainable way, renewal and protection of the natural wetlands and biodiversity, taking care of the drinking water, spurring of the economic development: organic production, tourism and protection of the diverse cultural heritage in each of the countries.

UNESCO Biosphere Reserve
The reserve was officially designated UNESCO Biosphere Reserve on 14 June 2017 under the title "Bačko Podunavlje". Podunavlje is the second UNESCO Biosphere Reserve in Serbia after Golija-Studenica, designated in 2001.

References

External links
 
 A Transboundary Biosphere Reserve for the benefit of nature and people

Protected areas of Croatia
Protected areas of Hungary
Biosphere reserves of Hungary
Biosphere reserves of Croatia